Joseph Derochie (born July 25, 1939) is a Canadian sprint canoer who competed in the early 1960s. He was eliminated in the repechage round of the C-2 1000 m event at the 1960 Summer Olympics in Rome.

His son is Darren Derochie, cross-country skier who competed in the 1992 Winter Games.

References
Sports-reference.com profile

1939 births
Canadian male canoeists
Canoeists at the 1960 Summer Olympics
Living people
Olympic canoeists of Canada